Lost Spirits is a working distillery with an amusement park-like tour founded by Bryan Davis and Joanne Haruta. The distillery was initially located in Salinas, California, where it opened in 2010. In 2016, the distillery was moved to downtown Los Angeles, California and later moved to Las Vegas, Nevada. The experience of visiting Lost Spirits has been described as "cult hit among spirits geeks". The distillery attracted attention after Davis developed technology to create mature whisky and rum within days.

Technology 
In 2015 the company attracted global media attention when Davis announced that he had invented a new means of aging spirits. Davis's process was shown, using modern analytical chemistry, to replicate the chemical reactions which take place as spirits age in barrels. The process aims to replicate the aging process in a laboratory while producing the same chemical signature and taste.

Whisky made using Davis' process performed favorably in blind tastings hosted by Whisky Advocate, and won a Liquid Gold award in Jim Murray's Whisky Bible (widely considered the world's most influential whisky critic).

Las Vegas Distillery 
In 2021, Davis and Haruta moved the distillery to Las Vegas. The new location included a tour described as "equated to an adult Disneyland."

References 

Wineries of the United States
Companies based in Nevada
2010 establishments in California